Frigo may refer to:

 Frigo (surname)
 A brand of ice cream made by Unilever
 A brand of cheese made by Saputo